The Szklary mine is a large mine in the centre of Poland in Szklary, Kłodzko County, 142 km south-west of the capital, Warsaw. Szklary represents the largest nickel reserve in Poland having estimated reserves of 28.8 million tonnes of ore grading 0.73% nickel. The 28.8 million tonnes of ore contains 210,000 tonnes of nickel metal.

References

External links 
 Official site

Nickel mines in Poland
Kłodzko County